The 1937 South Dakota State Jackrabbits football team was an American football team that represented South Dakota State University in the North Central Conference (NCC) during the 1937 college football season. In its fourth season under head coach Red Threlfall, the team compiled a 4–5 record and was outscored by a total of 147 to 102.

Schedule

References

South Dakota State
South Dakota State Jackrabbits football seasons
South Dakota State Jackrabbits football